Cedric Thomas is an American football coach and former player. He was most recently the head coach at Mississippi Delta Community College and was previously the Defensive backs coach at the University of Southern Mississippi. He is the former head football coach at the University of Arkansas–Pine Bluff, a position he has held from 2018 to 2019. Thomas played college football at Arkansas–Pine Bluff, before graduating in 2001.

Head coaching record

References

External links
 Arkansas–Pine Bluff profile

Year of birth missing (living people)
Living people
American football defensive backs
Alcorn State Braves football coaches
Arkansas–Pine Bluff Golden Lions football coaches
Arkansas–Pine Bluff Golden Lions football players
UT Martin Skyhawks football coaches
Junior college football coaches in the United States
African-American coaches of American football
African-American players of American football
21st-century African-American people